The Gnaoua World Music Festival is a Gnawa music festival held annually in Essaouira, Morocco. It was founded in 1998 by A3 Groupe, a private event-organizing company located in Casablanca.

The festival provides a platform for a meeting point of music and dialogue between foreign artists and the mystical Gnaoua (also Gnawa) musicians. In this melting-pot of musical fusion, the Gnaoua masters  invite players of jazz, pop, rock and contemporary World music to explore new avenues. The festivals see up to 500,000 visitors every year over four days; many of the performances can be viewed for free, which complicates comparison with other festivals.

See also 

 Moga Festival

 Gnaoua

References

External links
 Homepage
 Paris Holds Exhibition of Moroccan Gnaoua
  Gnaoua World Music Festival by the authors of Wiki Musique
"Gnaoua & Musique du Monde".

Music festivals in Morocco
World music festivals
Music festivals established in 1998